Stanisław Makula a Polish glider aerobatic pilot. He took part in several Polish Glider Aerobatic Championships and FAI European and World Championships. Together with his father Jerzy Makula and Krzystof Brzakalik he won the team silver medal in the 11th FAI World Glider Aerobatic Championships in Serpukhov in 2005.

References

Glider pilots
Aerobatic pilots
Polish aviators
Living people
Place of birth missing (living people)
Year of birth missing (living people)